Mpongwe may refer to: 

the Mpongwe people, an ethnic group in Gabon and their Mpongwe language
Mpongwe, Copperbelt, seat of the Mpongwe District in Zambia